125 Years is a public art installation at the University of Pennsylvania, made by Jenny Holzer in 2003.

Installation
It is located at Hill Square, University of Pennsylvania, between Chestnut Street, Walnut Street, 33rd Street and 34th Street. The artwork celebrates the 125 years of women at the University of Pennsylvania, which was inaugurated on November 7, 2003.

See also
List of public art in Philadelphia

References

2003 sculptures
Granite sculptures in Pennsylvania
University of Pennsylvania
2003 establishments in Pennsylvania